International Voluntary Service (IVS) is a peace organisation working for the sustainable development of local and global communities throughout the world. The organisation was formed in 1931 and is a registered charity in England, Wales and Scotland.

Guiding ethos 
The mission of the International Voluntary Service is to foster peace and understanding between peoples and nations through the mutual exchange of volunteers. This ethos is summed up by the organisation's strap line 'Volunteering for Peace'.

History

Formation 
In 1931, Service Civil International sent a team of international volunteers to the Welsh colliery town of Brynmawr. The volunteers redeveloped a brownfield site into a public park, which included an outdoor swimming pool.

The Brynmawr redevelopment was the first international project in the United Kingdom and marked the beginning of International Voluntary Service, shortly after IVS became the first recognised branch of the SCI.

Second World War 
In 1939 the UK Government officially recognised alternative civilian service as an alternative to military service. This policy change led to sharp rise in the number of active volunteers.

Current activities

Peace education 
Since 2011, IVS has delivered peace education within UK schools.

International volunteering

European Voluntary Service 
The International Voluntary Service is accredited as a sending and co-ordinating organisation for the European Voluntary Service.

Service Civil International 
The International Voluntary Service is a founding partner of Service Civil International, a global network of international volunteering organisations.

As a Partner, IVS can send and receive volunteers to and from countries with an active SCI branch.

Notable members

Frank Judd 
Between 1960–1966 Lord Frank Judd, Baron Judd acted as the Secretary General of the International Voluntary Service. Until his death in 2021 Lord Judd remained a Patron for IVS.

See also
 Antimilitarism
 Anti-war movement
 European Voluntary Service
 List of anti-war organizations
 Pacifism
 Peace movement
 Service Civil International

References

Bibliography
Ethelwyn Best, Bernhard Pike: International Voluntary Service for Peace 1920-1946, George Allen and Unwin, London, 1948
Arthur Gillette : One million volunteers: the story of volunteer youth service, Penguin Books, Harmondsworth, A pelican original, 1968, 258 p. on-line 
 Hélène Monastier, Alice Brügger: Paix, pelle et pioche, Histoire du Service Civil International, Editions du Service civil international, Switzerland, 1966
SCI : Service Civil International 1920-1990 - 70 years of Voluntary Service for Peace and Reconciliation, Verdun, 1990

External links

 

Organizations established in 1931
Organisations based in Edinburgh
Volunteer organisations in the United Kingdom
Peace organisations based in the United Kingdom